India competed at the 1952 Summer Olympics in Helsinki, Finland. 64 competitors, 60 men and 4 women, took part in 42 events in 11 sports. This marked the second time India had competed as an independent republic.

Medalists

Gold
 Kunwar Digvijai Singh (c), Leslie Claudius, Keshav Dutt, Chinadorai Deshmutu, Randhir Singh Gentle,  Grahanandan Singh, Ranganandhan Francis, Jaswant Singh Rajput, Balbir Singh Sr., Dharam Singh, Govind Perumal, Raghbir Lal, Udham Singh, and Muniswamy Rajgopal — Field hockey, Men's Team Competition.

Bronze
 Khashaba Jadhav — Wrestling, Men's Freestyle Bantamweight

Athletics

First Female Contingent

Athletics
Mary Dsouza
Nilima Ghose

Boxing

Men's Flyweight:
 Sakti Mazumdar
 First Round – Defeated Nguyen Van Cua of Vietnam (DNS)
 Second Round – Lost to Han Soo-An of Korea (0 - 3)

Men's Featherweight:
 Benoy Kumar Bose
 First Round – "Defeated" Edson Brown of the United States (0 - 3)

Men's Welterweight: 
 Ron Norris
 Second Round – Defeated Jacob Butula of Canada (TKO 3R)
 Third Round – Lost to Viktor Jörgensen of Denmark (0 - 3)

Men's Light Heavyweight: 
 Oscar Alfred Ward
 First Round – Lost to Karl Kistner of Germany (KO)

Cycling

Road Competition 
Men's Individual Road Race (190.4 km)
Raj Kumar Mehra — did not finish (→ no ranking)
Netai Bysack — did not finish (→ no ranking)
Prodip Bose — did not finish (→ no ranking)
Suprovat Chakravarty — did not finish (→ no ranking)

Track Competition 
Men's 1.000m Time Trial
Suprovat Chakravarty
 Final — 1:26.0 (→ 27th and last place)

Men's 1.000m Sprint Scratch Race
Netai Bysack — 24th place

Football

Gymnastics

Hockey

Shooting

Two shooters represented India in 1952.

300 m rifle, three positions
 Harihar Banerjee

50 m rifle, three positions
 Harihar Banerjee

50 m rifle, prone
 Harihar Banerjee
 Souren Choudhury

Swimming
Dolly Nazir
Aarti Saha

Water polo

Birendra Basak • David Sopher • Kedar Shah • Isaac Mansoor • Sambhu Saha • Sachin Nag • Khamlillal Shah • Bijoy Barman • Jehangir Naegamwalla • Ran Chandnani (source: olympedia.org)

Weightlifting

Wrestling

Men's freestyle

References

Nations at the 1952 Summer Olympics
1952